APEH or Apeh may refer to:
APEH (gene)
AP European History, US high school course
Adó- és Pénzügyi Ellenőrző Hivatal (Tax and Financial Control Administration), the Hungarian pre-2010 Revenue service

People with the name
Emmanuel Apeh (born 1996), Nigerian footballer